Dwight Lee (September 3, 1945 – December 29, 2016) was an American football running back. He played for the San Francisco 49ers and Atlanta Falcons in 1968 and for the Montreal Alouettes in 1969.

He died of liver cancer on December 29, 2016, in Eugene, Oregon at age 71.

References

1945 births
2016 deaths
American football running backs
Michigan State Spartans football players
San Francisco 49ers players
Atlanta Falcons players
Montreal Alouettes players